Quadrophenia is a 1979 British drama film, loosely based on The Who's 1973 rock opera of the same name. It was directed by Franc Roddam in his feature directing début. Unlike the adaptation of Tommy, Quadrophenia is not a musical film, and the band does not appear live in the film.

The film is set in London in 1964, a time when the working class youth broadly aligned themselves with one of two factions, who frequently fought each other. The Mods wore sharp suits, listened to current pop and soul music, took amphetamines, and rode scooters. Rockers rode powerful British motorcycles such as Triumph and BSA, wore black leather jackets and listened to 1950s rock'n'roll.

The film stars Phil Daniels as Jimmy, a young mod who escapes from his dead-end job as a mailroom boy by dancing, partying, taking amphetamines, riding his scooter and brawling with Rockers. After he and his friends participate in a huge brawl with the Rockers at the seaside town of Brighton, he is arrested and his life starts to spiral out of control; he loses his love interest (Leslie Ash), gets kicked out of his house by his parents, and discovers that his idol, the popular mod nicknamed "Ace Face" (Sting), is actually a bellboy at a hotel.

Plot
In 1964, young London Mod Jimmy Cooper (Phil Daniels), disillusioned with his parents and a dull job as a post room boy in an advertising firm, vents his teenage angst by taking amphetamines, partying, riding scooters and brawling with Rockers, accompanied by his Mod friends Dave (Mark Wingett), Chalky (Philip Davis) and Spider (Gary Shail).

An attack by hostile Rockers on Spider leads to a retaliatory attack on Jimmy's childhood friend Kevin (Ray Winstone), one of the rival Rockers. Jimmy initially participates, but upon realising the victim is Kevin, he berates the other attackers but does not stop them, instead riding away on his scooter revving his engine loudly in frustration.

A planned bank holiday weekend away provides the excuse for the rivalry between Mods and Rockers to escalate, as both groups descend upon the seaside town of Brighton. Jimmy plans to be noticed as a 'face', and hints to Steph (Leslie Ash) – a girl on whom he has a crush – that he would like her to ride with him, but she confirms plans to ride instead with Pete (Garry Cooper), an older, well-heeled Mod.

To prepare for the weekend, the pals try to buy some recreational drugs from London gangster Harry North (John Bindon), but are cheated with fake pills. After vandalising the drug-seller's car in retaliation, they desperately rob a pharmacy, finding a large quantity of their favourite "blues".

After an early morning group ride from London to the south coast, the friends gather on the seafront, where Jimmy first sees a flamboyant scooter-riding Mod he describes as Ace Face (Sting). Later in a dance hall, Jimmy suggests that he will help Steph, whose escort is now chatting to an attractive American girl, to dance with Ace Face, but on the dance floor ushers her away to dance with himself. Steph leaves Jimmy to dance with Ace Face, whereupon Jimmy plots to gain attention by climbing up on to the balcony-edge and dancing with much applause, annoying Ace Face. After diving into the audience, Jimmy is ejected by bouncers. Steph's escort leaves with the American girl, and once again Jimmy tries to get with Steph, this time for the night, but she has arranged accommodation with a female friend.

The lads spend the night sleeping rough, meet up at a cafe on the following morning, then proceed along the promenade, where a series of running battles ensue. As the police corner the rioters, Jimmy escapes down an alleyway with Steph, and they have sex. When the pair emerge, they find themselves amidst the melee just as police are detaining rioters. Jimmy is arrested and detained with the volatile Ace Face. When fined a hefty £75——Ace Face mocks the magistrate (John Phillips) by offering to pay on the spot with a cheque, impressing the fellow Mods.

Back in London, Jimmy becomes severely depressed. His mother throws him out after finding his stash of amphetamine pills. He then quits his job, spends his severance package on more pills, and learns that Steph is now his friend Dave's girlfriend. After briefly fighting with Dave, the following morning his rejection is confirmed by Steph, and his beloved Lambretta scooter is accidentally damaged in a crash involving a Royal Mail parcel van. Jimmy takes a train back to Brighton, taking increasing levels of pills and becoming more emotionally unstable.

Attempting to relive the recent excitement, he revisits the scenes of the riots and his encounter with Steph. Then, Jimmy horrifyingly discovers that his idol, Ace Face, has a menial job as a bellboy at the Grand Brighton Hotel. Jimmy steals Ace's Vespa scooter and heads out to Beachy Head, riding close to the cliff-edge. Finally, the scooter is seen crashing over the cliff-top, which is where the film begins with Jimmy walking back against a sunset backdrop.

Cast

John Lydon (Johnny Rotten of the Sex Pistols) screen-tested for the role of Jimmy. The distributors of the film refused to insure him for the part and he was replaced by Phil Daniels.

Most of the cast were reunited after 28 years at Earls Court on 1 and 2 September 2007 as part of The Quadrophenia Reunion at the London Film & Comic Con run by Quadcon.co.uk. Subsequently, the cast agreed to be part of a Quadrophenia Convention at Brighton in 2009.

Soundtrack

Quadrophenia is the soundtrack album to the 1979 film of the same name, which refers to the 1973 rock opera Quadrophenia. It was initially released on Polydor Records in 1979 as a cassette and LP and was re-released as a compact disc in 1993 and 2001. The album was dedicated to Peter Meaden, a prominent Mod and first manager of The Who, who had died a year before the album's release.

The album contains ten of the seventeen tracks from the original rock opera Quadrophenia (as not all of the tracks were used in the film). These are different mixes from those that appear on the 1973 album as they were remixed in 1979 by John Entwistle. The most notable difference is the track "The Real Me" (used for the title sequence of the film) which features a different bass track, more prominent vocals and a more definite ending. Most of the tracks are also edited to be slightly shorter. The soundtrack also includes three tracks by The Who that did not appear on the 1973 album.

Production

Several references to The Who appear throughout the film as "Easter eggs", including an anachronistic inclusion of a repackaged Who album that was not available at the time, a clip of the band performing "Anyway, Anyhow, Anywhere" on the TV series Ready Steady Go!, pictures of the band and a "Maximum R&B" poster in Jimmy's bedroom, and the inclusion of "My Generation" during a party gatecrashing scene. The film was almost cancelled when Keith Moon, the drummer for The Who, died, but in the words of Roddam, the producers, Roy Baird and Bill Curbishley, "held it together" and the film was made.

Only one scene in the film was shot in the studio; all others were on location. Beachy Head, where Jimmy considers suicide at the end of the film, was the location of a real-life suicide that supposedly influenced the film's ending.

The stunt coordinators underestimated the distance that the scooter would fly through the air after being driven off Beachy Head. Franc Roddam, who shot the scene from a helicopter, was almost hit.

Jeff Dexter, a club dancer and disc jockey fixture in the Sixties London music scene was the DJ in the club scenes, and was the uncredited choreographer of 500 extras for the ballroom and club scenes. He also choreographed Sting's feet in his dance close-ups. Dexter managed America whose first major gig at "Implosion" at The Roundhouse, Chalk Farm, was the opening act to The Who on 20 December 1970.

Black actor Trevor Laird (Ferdy) was scripted to appear in a party scene kissing and having sex with a white girl, but was excluded from the scene by associate producer John Peverall due to concerns that it could cause problems with distributors in South Africa and the southern United States. Toyah Wilcox has said that cast members discussed going on strike over the incident.

Reception
The film had its premiere at the Plaza cinema in London on 16 August 1979. It opened to the public the following day and grossed £36,472 in its opening week from four cinemas in London, placing second behind Moonraker at the London box office.

Janet Maslin, reviewing the film for The New York Times in 1979, called it "...gritty and ragged and sometimes quite beautiful", creating a "...slice-of-life movie that feels tremendously authentic in its sentiments as well as its details." Maslin states that the director's scenes of youth battles "...capture a fierce, dizzying excitement that epitomizes a kind of youthful extreme." Reviewer Brian Gibson from Vue Weekly (Edmonton, Canada) stated that "Roddam's look back at an angsty young man in '65 is a throwback to the kitchen-sink dramas that began plumbing the depths of working class lives then. Reeking with a restless teen spirit, Quadrophenia leads us down adolescence's blind alleys of rebellion." Critic Matt Brunson 
from Creative Loafing stated that the film "[m]anages to be both quintessentially British and irrefutably universal", giving it a 3.5/4 score. Reviewer Eric Melin from Scene-Stealers.com states that the film has a "...gritty, realistic feel and the themes of youthful rebellion and confusion are absolutely timeless, magnified by the specificity of the setting rather than being limited by it"; he also gave the movie a 3.5/4 score. Reviewer Christopher Long from Movie Metropolis commented that "[w]hen you're an angry young man [like the main character], there's no better way to prove you're an individual than to dress and act exactly like everybody else"; Long gave the film a 6/10 score.

Dennis Schwartz from Ozus' World Movie Reviews stated that the "...film lives through the superb raw angst-ridden performance of [lead] Phil Daniels"; Schwartz gave the movie a B+. Critic Cole Smithey from ColeSmithey.com called the film a "...glorious representational story of male teen angst that transcends its British locations and great music with a sense of the confused romantic notions that young men the world over carry with them"; Smithey gave the film an A+. Reviewer Ken Hanke from the Mountain Xpress (Asheville, NC) called it a "[d]isappointing film version of a great concept album"; he gave the film a 3/5 score. Film critic Jeffrey M. Anderson from Combustible Celluloid states that where the film "...succeeds[, it does so] through its devil-may-care attitude and energy"; on the other hand, Anderson states that the film "...feels like a low-budget homemade movie from the period."

Rotten Tomatoes collected reviews from 13 critics and gave Quadrophenia a 100% rating.

The New York Times placed the film on its Best 1000 Movies Ever list.

Home media

Universal Pictures Home Entertainment first released the film on DVD in 1999 with an 8-minute montage featurette. It used the VHS print, resulting in a much lower-quality video than expected. Following this in the US was a special edition by Rhino, which included a remastered letterboxed wide screen transfer, a commentary, several interviews, galleries, and a quiz. However, it was a shorter cut of the film, with several minutes of footage missing.

Rhino Home Video released the film on DVD on 25 September 2001.

On 7 August 2006, Universal improved upon their original DVD with a Region 2 two-disc special edition. The film was digitally remastered and included a new commentary by Franc Roddam, Phil Daniels and Leslie Ash. Disc 2 features an hour-long documentary and a featurette with Roddam discussing the locations. Unlike their previous DVD, it was the complete, longer version, and it was matted to the correct aspect ratio.

The Criterion Collection released a special edition version of this movie on 28 August 2012, on both DVD and Blu-ray formats.

References

Bibliography
 Ali Catterall and Simon Wells, Your Face Here: British Cult Movies Since The Sixties (Fourth Estate, 2001),

External links

 
 
 
 Liner notes on – songs Get Out And Stay Out, Four Faces, Joker James
 Quadrophenia.net
 The Quadrophenia Collection at Littledean Jail
Quadrophenia: Jimmy vs. World an essay by Howard Hampton at the Criterion Collection

1979 films
1970s teen drama films
1979 independent films
British coming-of-age drama films
British independent films
British musical drama films
British teen drama films
1970s coming-of-age drama films
1970s English-language films
Films based on albums
Films based on operas
Films directed by Franc Roddam
Films set in 1964
Films set in Brighton
Films set in London
Films shot at EMI-Elstree Studios
Films shot in East Sussex
Films shot in London
Mod revival
1970s musical drama films
Pete Townshend
Quadrophenia
Rock musicals
Teen musical films
The Who
Universal Pictures films
Mod (subculture)
1979 directorial debut films
1979 drama films
1970s British films